Grazing in the Grass: The Best of Hugh Masekela is a 2001 compilation album by South African jazz trumpeter Hugh Masekela. The album was released via the Columbia label. This is a retrospective collection that includes 14 tracks by Masekela.

Reception
Bruce Eder of AllMusic noted: "This release is superb, but also a little confusing -- it is, as its packaging suggests, a magnificent retrospective of a global jazz legend, despite the fact that it must, of necessity, leave some holes in a 14-song selection intended to sum up a 40-year career. What isn't clear until one opens it, however, is that little of what's here -- none of it, in fact -- consists of the original recordings; rather, these are re-recordings done for Columbia in much more recent times. And that's not necessarily bad, as Masekela has lost little of his fire over the ensuing four decades and did get to do these tracks under ideal conditions."

Track listing

Personnel
Hugh Masekela – flugelhorn, trumpet, producer
Vusi Khumalo – drums
Don Laka – various instruments
Makhaya Mahlangu – flute, saxophone
Kenny Mathaba – guitar
Cedric Samson – drums, percussion, producer
John Selolwane – guitar

References

External links

2001 compilation albums
Hugh Masekela albums